The 2022 NCAA Division I women's volleyball tournament was a single-elimination tournament of 64 teams that determined the National Collegiate Athletic Association (NCAA) Division I women's volleyball national champion for the 2022 season. The 42nd edition of the tournament began on December 1, 2022 in various college campuses across the country, location determinations were chosen based on participating teams seedings. The tournament concluded with the championship game at CHI Health Center in Omaha on December 17, when Texas defeated Louisville 3–0. The win gave Texas its 4th national title and first since 2012. 

The 2022 NCAA tournament was the first time that 32 teams are seeded (previously, only 16 national seeds were awarded). For the first time since 2013, Texas earned the number 1 overall seed. Louisville, defending 2021 NCAA champion Wisconsin, and Stanford, rounded out the overall number 2–4 national seeds. Penn State, the no. 4 regional seed in the Wisconsin bracket, earned its 42nd straight bid to the NCAA tournament, remaining the only Division I team to participate in every NCAA tournament since its inception in 1981.

Among the Power Five conferences, the SEC led all conferences with seven bids, followed by the Big Ten and Pac-12 with six each, and the ACC and Big 12 with five each. 

Throughout the first two rounds of play, only one top four regional seeded team failed to advance to the Sweet 16 (no. 4 Creighton in the Stanford regional). The Big Ten conference recorded the best win/loss record in the first two rounds, going 11–1 in matches played and advancing 5 of 6 teams to the Sweet 16. Additionally, only three non-Power five conference teams advanced past the second round (San Diego, Marquette, and Houston). The wins gave Houston the program's first NCAA tournament match win since the 1994 tournament.

Texas, Louisville, Pittsburgh, and San Diego advanced to the final four. Pittsburgh's upset win over Wisconsin and Texas's defeat of Ohio State snapped a 14 year streak of at least one Big Ten conference team in the final four. Stanford and Oregon's losses also shut out the Pac-12 from advancing, marking the first time in the 42 year history of the NCAA tournament that no final four teams came from the Big Ten or Pac 12 conference.  San Diego advanced to its first final four in school history after upsetting Stanford 3–2. Louisville and Pittsburgh advanced to its second straight final four, setting up a rematch between the ACC foes; they split their regular season matches, handing each other its only conference loss of the season as they ultimately won a share of the conference title.

Tournament schedule and venues 

First and Second Rounds (Subregionals)
 December 1–4
 Gregory Gymnasium, Austin, Texas (Host: University of Texas)
 Al McGuire Center, Milwaukee, Wisconsin (Host: Marquette University)
 Memorial Coliseum, Lexington, Kentucky (Host: University of Kentucky)
 Jenny Craig Pavilion, San Diego, California (Host: University of San Diego)
 Devaney Center, Lincoln, Nebraska (Host: University of Nebraska)
 Ferrell Center, Waco, Texas (Host: Baylor University)
 L&N Federal Credit Union Arena, Louisville, Kentucky (Host: University of Louisville)
 O'Connell Center, Gainesville, Florida (Host: University of Florida)
 Petersen Events Center, Pittsburgh, Pennsylvania (Host: University of Pittsburgh)
 UW Field House, Madison, Wisconsin (Host: University of Wisconsin)
 Maples Pavilion, Palo Alto, California (Host: Stanford University)
 Rec Hall, University Park, Pennsylvania, (Host: Penn State University)
 Covelli Center, Columbus, Ohio (Host: Ohio State University)
 Maturi Pavilion, Minneapolis, Minnesota (Host: University of Minnesota)
 Matthew Knight Arena, Eugene, Oregon (Host: University of Oregon)
 Sokol Arena, Omaha, Nebraska (Host: Creighton University)

Regional semifinals and finals
 December 8 & 10
 Austin Regional, Gregory Gymnasium (Host: University of Texas)
 Louisville Regional, Freedom Hall (Host: University of Louisville) 
 Madison Regional, Wisconsin Field House (Host: University of Wisconsin)
 Palo Alto Regional, Maples Pavilion (Host: Stanford University)

National semifinals and championship
 December 15 & 17
 CHI Health Center Omaha, Omaha, Nebraska (Host: University of Nebraska)

Qualifying teams

Automatic qualifiers

Tournament seeds

Bracket

Austin, TX Regional

Schedule

First round

Second round

Regional semifinals

Regional finals

Region all-tournament team

The following players were named to the Texas regional all-tournament team: 

Logan Eggleston (Texas) – Most Outstanding Player
Zoe Fleck (Texas)
Asjia O'Neal (Texas)
Emily Londot (Ohio State)
Gabby Gonzales (Ohio State)
Hattie Bray (Marquette)
Jenna Wenaas (Minnesota)

Palo Alto, CA Regional

Schedule

First round

Second round

Regional semifinals

Regional finals

Region all-tournament team

The following players were named to the Stanford regional all-tournament team: 

Gabby Blossom (San Diego) – Most Outstanding Player
Katie Lukes (San Diego)
Grace Frohling (San Diego)
Kendall Kipp (Stanford)
Kami Miner (Stanford)
Elena Oglivie (Stanford)
Kortlyn Henderson (Houston)

Madison, WI Regional

Schedule

First round

Second round

Regional semifinals

Regional finals

Region all-tournament team

The following players were named to the Wisconsin regional all-tournament team: 

Courtney Buzzerio (Pittsburgh) – Most Outstanding Player
Rachel Fairbanks  (Pittsburgh)
Chiamaka Nwokolo  (Pittsburgh)
Devyn Robinson (Wisconsin)
Anna Smrek  (Wisconsin)
Marina Markova (Florida)
Seleisa Elisaia (Penn State)

Louisville, KY Regional

Schedule

First round

Second round

Regional semifinals

Regional finals

Region all-tournament team

The following players were named to the Louisville regional all-tournament team: 

Anna DeBeer (Louisville) – Most Outstanding Player
Aiko Jones (Louisville)
Claire Chaussee (Louisville)
Mimi Colyer (Oregon)
Brooke Nuneviller (Oregon)
Morgan Lewis (Oregon)
Ally Batenhorst (Nebraska)

Final four

National semifinals

Game recap 
Texas defeated San Diego in the first semifinal match. San Diego was making its first final four appearance in school history and Texas was making its 14th final four. San Diego won the opening set in extra points, 28–26, before Texas came back to win the next three with scores of 25–16, 25–18, 25–20. Texas was led by junior outside hitter Madisen Skinner who had 17 kills on .394 hitting percentage and 2022 AVCA Player of the Year Logan Eggleston finished with 16 kills, nine digs, a team-high five blocks and one service ace. Texas was held to their second-lowest hitting percentage of the season at .248 but out–blocked San Diego 12–9 and held the Toreros to their worst hitting night of the season at .112.

In the second semifinal, Louisville defeated Pittsburgh 3–2. The teams, who are both in the ACC conference, handed each other its only conference loss of the season, as they both went 17–1 in conference play to claim a share of the title. Both teams were making their second straight (and second overall in school history) NCAA final four appearance. After going back-and-forth in the first four sets, Louisville won the fifth set with a runaway score of 15–2 to advance to its first national title match in school history, and became the first ACC team to advance to a championship match. In the match, three Louisville players had season-best performances: libero Elena Scott finished with a career-high 28 digs, middle blocker Phekran Kong set a career record with 11 blocks, including four in the fifth set, and outside hitter Anna DeBeer had a career best five service aces. Louisville was led by Claire Chaussee with 25 kills, including four in the fifth set, hitting .429 and added three kills and three blocks. Pittsburgh was led by Courtney Buzzerio with 13 kills and Serena Gray with 10 kills.

National championship

Game recap

Texas won its third NCAA (and fourth overall) national championship after defeating Louisville in three sets. Texas became the first overall number one seed to win the championship since Stanford in 2018. Texas was ranked number 1 for most of the 2022 season and was led by six All-Americans.

Texas won the close first set 25–22. Louisville jumped out to an early lead but most of the set was led by Texas, who led 18–17, before going on a 3–1 run to go up 21–18, eventually winning on a kill by Eggleston.  Texas hit .533 in the first set to Louisville's .400. Texas dominated the second set, going up 15–7 and eventually winning 25–14. What would be the third and final set, Louisville led 15–14 lead going into the media timeout, before Texas went on a 6–1 run to go up 20–16. Louisville tied the set at 21 all on a block and went up 24–22 on back to back kills. Despite having two set point chances to force a fourth set, Louisville could not close the set as Texas won the championship on a service ace, 26–24. In the match, Texas hit .371 as a team, with nine blocks and five service aces, while holding Louisville to just a .189 hitting percentage.

Final Four All-Tournament Team

The following players were named to the final four all-tournament team: 

Logan Eggleston (Texas) – Most Outstanding Player
Saige Ka'aha'aina-Torres (Texas)
Asjia O'Neal (Texas)
Madisen Skinner (Texas)
Claire Chaussee (Louisville)
Anna DeBeer (Louisville)
Aiko Jones (Louisville)

Media coverage
For the third consecutive season all matches aired on the ESPN Family of networks. Rounds 1 and 2 streamed on ESPN+ with the exception of Texas matches, which were televised by LHN.  All Sweet 16 and Elite 8 matches will air on ESPNU. ESPN will air the national semifinals while ESPN2 will air the national championship.

Rounds 1 & 2 

Austin: Alex Loeb and Nicole Branagh
Columbus: Tyler Danburg, Hanna Williford (Fri), and Zachary Rodier (Sat)
Eugene: Knight Jarecki and Ryan Milano
Gainesville: Tom Collett, Josh Crow (Fri), and Missy Whittemore (Sat)
Lincoln: Larry Punteney and Kathi Wieskamp
Louisville: Jeff Milby and Stephanie Cantway
Lexington: Jeff Greer and Leah Edmond 
Madison: Aiden Michaels, Rachel Cohen (Fri), and Matt Blaustein (Sat)  

Milwaukee: Bob Brainerd and Michelle Griffin-Wenzel
Minneapolis: Connor O'Neal, Meredith Nelson-Uram, and Emma Carpenter 
Omaha: Jake Eisenberg, Shannon Smolinski, and Anna Bellinghausen
Pittsburgh: Jeff Hathhorn and Amanda Silay
University Park: Preston Shoemaker (Fri), Matt Scalzo, and Thomas English (Sat)  
Waco: Pete Sousa, Katie Smith (Thurs), and Adam Johnson (Fri)
San Diego: Braden Surprenant
Stanford: Ben Ross and Jordan Watkins (Fri), Troy Clardy and Tim Swartz (Sat)

Regional semifinals & Regional Finals 

Austin: Holly McPeak and Courtney Lyle
Louisville: Eric Frede and Katie George

Madison: Sam Gore and Shelby Coppedge
Stanford: Paul Sunderland and Missy Whittemore

Semifinals & National Championship 

Holly McPeak, Courtney Lyle, and Katie George

Records by Conference

The R32, S16, E8, F4, CM, and NC columns indicate how many teams from each conference were in the Round of 32 (second round), Round of 16 (third round), quarterfinals (Elite Eight), semi-finals (Final Four), Championship Match, and National Champion, respectively.
The following conferences failed to place a team into the round of 32: America East, Atlantic 10, Big Sky, Big South, Big West, Colonial, Horizon, Ivy, MAAC, MEAC, Mountain West, Northeast, Ohio Valley, Patriot, Southern, Southland, SWAC, Summit, Sun Belt, and the WAC. The conference's records have been consolidated in the other row.

References

NCAA Women's Volleyball Championship
Women's volleyball
Volleyball in Nebraska
Sports competitions in Nebraska
NCAA Division I women's volleyball tournament
NCAA Division I women's volleyball tournament
NCAA Division I women's volleyball tournament
2022 in sports in Nebraska